The Rosary is a 1931 British drama film directed by Guy Newall and starring Margot Grahame, Elizabeth Allan and Leslie Perrins. It was shot at Twickenham Studios in London. The film's sets were designed by the art director James A. Carter. It was released as an independent first feature, despite being produced by a company that generally concentrated on quota quickies.

Synopsis
A woman takes the blame for a murder accidentally committed by her half-sister.

Cast
 Margot Grahame as Mary Edwards
 Elizabeth Allan as Vera Mannering
 Walter Piers as 	Captain Mannering
 Leslie Perrins as 	Ronald Overton
 Robert Holmes as 	Dalmayne
 Charles Groves as 	Hornett
 Irene Rooke as Mother Superior
 Les Allen as 	The Singer

References

Bibliography
 Chibnall, Steve. Quota Quickies: The Birth of the British 'B' Film. British Film Institute, 2007.
 Low, Rachael. Filmmaking in 1930s Britain. George Allen & Unwin, 1985.
Wood, Linda. British Films, 1927–1939. British Film Institute, 1986.

External links

1931 films
British black-and-white films
1931 drama films
Films directed by Guy Newall
British drama films
1930s British films
Films shot at Twickenham Film Studios
1930s English-language films